

Byrhthelm (died 973) was the Bishop of Wells and briefly the archbishop of Canterbury. A monk from Glastonbury Abbey, he served as Bishop of Wells beginning in 956, then was translated to Canterbury in 959, only to be translated back to Wells in the same year.

In October 959, King Eadwig died and his brother Edgar was readily accepted as ruler of the Kingdom of England. One of the last acts of Eadwig had been to appoint a successor to Archbishop Oda, who died on 2 June 958. First he appointed  Ælfsige of Winchester, but he perished of cold in the Alps as he journeyed to Rome for the pallium. In his place Eadwig nominated Byrhthelm. Byrhthelm was a supporter of Eadwig, and as soon as Edgar became king he reversed this act on the ground that Byrhthelm had not been able to even govern the Diocese of Wells properly. Edgar said that Byrhthelm was too gentle to maintain discipline, and he was replaced with Dunstan. He returned to Wells, where he served until he died on 15 May 973.

Notes

Citations

References

External links
 

Archbishops of Canterbury
Bishops of Wells
10th-century English archbishops
English Christian monks
973 deaths
Year of birth unknown